Martin Fedor is a member of Slovak National Council and he served as Minister of Defence of Slovakia after the resignation of Juraj Liška because of a Slovak Air Force An-24 crash in 2006.

Early life 

Martin Fedor was born on March 4, 1974, in Považská Bystrica. He studied international relations at Comenius University in Bratislava from 1992 to 1997. After he received a master's degree in political sciences he continued with more educational activities and work for several privately held organizations. Martin Fedor is married.

Political career 

Martin Fedor joined the Slovak Democratic and Christian Union in 2001 and he has been active in politics ever since. He was also a member of Slovak Democratic and Christian Union youth association - New Generation since 2001.

 1996 - 1998 - personal secretary to Mr. Dzurinda
 1998 - 2000 - head of office of the prime minister
 2000 - 2002 - director of international relations of Slovak Democratic and Christian Union
 2002 - 2003 - work at Embassy in Ireland
 2003 - 2006 - deputy Minister of Defence of Slovakia
 2006 - Minister of Defence of Slovakia
 2006 - present - member of Slovak National Council

He left SDKÚ-DS in 2016 and joined Radoslav Procházka's #Network. After receiving only 5.6% in the 2016 Slovak parliamentary elections, and secret talks between Procházka and Robert Fico to join the coalition government led by SMER-SD, #Network started to fall apart, and after few months all the group's MPs had either become independent (going on to form the new party SPOLU) or joined another coalition party, Most-Híd. Fedor joined Most-Híd in 2016 and been a member since then.

Political party membership 
 2001 - 2014 - Slovak Democratic and Christian Union
 2001 - 2014 - Slovak Democratic and Christian Union youth association - New Generation
 2015 - 2016 - #Network
 2016 - present - Most–Híd

References

External links
 https://web.archive.org/web/20061208065233/http://www.government.gov.sk/english/minister_mo.html
 

1974 births
Living people
People from Považská Bystrica
Defence Ministers of Slovakia
Slovak Democratic and Christian Union – Democratic Party politicians
Members of the National Council (Slovakia) 2006-2010
Members of the National Council (Slovakia) 2010-2012
Members of the National Council (Slovakia) 2012-2016
Members of the National Council (Slovakia) 2016-2020